As a nickname, Jigger may refer to:

 Edwin Harlan (1886–1939), American football and baseball player, coach and attorney
 Albert Jigger Johnson (1871–1935), American logging foreman
 John Johnson, the second two-time Indianapolis 500-winning riding mechanic (1931 and 1937)
 Darach O'Connor (born 1995), Irish Gaelic footballer
 Gerard Phalen (born 1934), former Canadian senator, educator and union leader
 Jacob Siegel (fl. 1900–1910), American gunman turned professional gambler
 Leon Sirois (born 1935), American former race car driver
 Jigger Statz (1897–1988), American Major League Baseball player
 Giannis Vardinogiannis (born 1962), Greek billionaire shipping magnate

See also 

Lists of people by nickname